This is a list of tennis players who have represented the New Zealand Davis Cup team in an official Davis Cup match. New Zealand have taken part in the competition since 1924. Before that, New Zealander was represented by the Australasia Davis Cup team. Only one New Zealander competed for Australasia (Tony Wilding), though another Australasian representative, Australia's Alfred Dunlop, was New Zealand-born.

Players

References

Lists of Davis Cup tennis players
Davis Cup